Paulo Cesar Bonfim (born July 15, 1971) is a former Brazilian football player.

Playing career
Paulinho joined Japanese J1 League club Verdy Kawasaki in 1992. However he could not play many matches behind Japan international player, Kazuyoshi Miura and Nobuhiro Takeda. Paulinho played 2 matches in 1992 J.League Cup. He could not play at all in the match in 1993 and left the club end of 1993 season.

Club statistics

References

External links

1971 births
Living people
Brazilian footballers
Brazilian expatriate footballers
J1 League players
Tokyo Verdy players
Expatriate footballers in Japan
Association football forwards